Felipe Cárdenas (born 22 July 1991) is a Chilean rower. He competed in the men's lightweight double sculls event at the 2016 Summer Olympics.

References

External links
 

1991 births
Living people
Chilean male rowers
Olympic rowers of Chile
Rowers at the 2016 Summer Olympics
Place of birth missing (living people)
Pan American Games medalists in rowing
Pan American Games bronze medalists for Chile
Rowers at the 2015 Pan American Games
South American Games silver medalists for Chile
South American Games medalists in rowing
Competitors at the 2014 South American Games
Medalists at the 2019 Pan American Games
Medalists at the 2015 Pan American Games
21st-century Chilean people